Sir William Henry Solomon  (25 September 1852 – 3 June 1930) was a judge of the Appellate Division from 1910 to 1929 and Chief Justice of South Africa from 1927 to 1929.

Early life and family

Born in 1852, he was the son of the missionary Edward Solomon and his wife, Jessie Matthews. He was also the nephew of the great liberal politician and founder of the Cape Argus, Saul Solomon.

Career

From the age of 35, he served for 10 years as a judge for the Griqualand West supreme court.

After the end of the Second Boer War, the government of the newly created British Colony of Transvaal established a Supreme Court of Transvaal in April 1902. The governor, Lord Milner, appointed Wessels as one of three puisne judges, with Sir James Rose Innes as Chief Justice. Solomon was transferred to this Supreme Court too, and he was appointed to the first Appeal Court for the new Union of South Africa when it was formed in 1910.

He was appointed Chief Justice of South Africa in 1927. At the end of his career he also sat on the Judicial Committee of the Privy Council.

He is buried in the Solomon family plot in Brookwood Cemetery.

References

Chief justices of South Africa
South African judges
South African knights
South African people of Jewish descent
1852 births
1930 deaths
19th-century South African people
South African Knights Commander of the Order of St Michael and St George
Knights Commander of the Order of the Star of India
Burials at Brookwood Cemetery
South African members of the Privy Council of the United Kingdom
South African Queen's Counsel